HMS Portisham was one of 93 ships of the  of inshore minesweepers.

Their names were all chosen from villages ending in -ham. The minesweeper was named after Portesham in Dorset, using an alternative spelling for the village.

Portisham served in the Royal Navy from 1956 until 1964, when she was transferred to the Royal Naval Auxiliary Service (RNXS).

On 15 April 1973, Portisham assisted a Royal Dutch Navy Breguet Atlantic aircraft no 257 which ditched off Wassenaar, Netherlands.

Portisham was removed from service in 1983. After her sale in 1989 she was laid up and for sale in a boatyard in Essex. She was procured for conversion to a liveaboard ship by an Irish national in 2007 and is currently the second biggest private vessel under the Irish flag.

References
Man living in ‘floating home’ wins reprieve against council
Supreme Court defers ruling in row over ‘floating home’ in Dublin
Blackman, R.V.B. ed. Jane's Fighting Ships various editions
Colledge J.J. Ships of the Royal Navy various editions
Cocker M.P.  Mine Warfare Vessels of the Royal Navy (1993)

 

Ham-class minesweepers
Royal Navy ship names
1955 ships
Ships and vessels on the National Archive of Historic Vessels